Roy Drysdale Brown FIMechE FIET (born 4 December 1946) is a British engineer and business executive, who was the chairman of the international engineering conglomerate GKN from 2004 until 2012.

He attended the independent Tonbridge School. On a GEC scholarship he went to University College London, where he gained a BSc in Mechanical Engineering.

He worked for Unilever from 1974 to 2001, and later became chairman of the Scottish telecommunications company Thus plc.

Brown joined GKN as a non-executive director in 1996 and became the company's chairman in May 2004. He was replaced by Michael Turner in May 2012.

He married Carol Wallace in 1978 and they have two sons. He became a Fellow of the Institution of Mechanical Engineers in 1983, and a Fellow of the IEE (which became the Institution of Engineering & Technology) in 1990.

References

1946 births
Alumni of University College London
Fellows of the Institution of Engineering and Technology
Fellows of the Institution of Mechanical Engineers
People educated at Tonbridge School
Living people